Capoeta ferdowsii is a species of cyprinid in the genus Capoeta, native the Zohreh and Fahlian rivers in Iran. It is named after Persian poet Ferdowsi.

References

ferdowsii
Fish described in 2017